HMS E22 was a British E-class submarine built by Vickers, Barrow-in-Furness. She was laid down on 27 August 1914 and was commissioned on 8 November 1915.

Design
She was powered by two  Vickers eight-cylinder two-stroke diesel engines and two  electric motors.

E22 was armed with five 18-inch (450 mm) torpedo tubes, two in the bow, one either side amidships, and one in the stern; a total of 10 torpedoes were carried.

E-Class submarines had wireless systems with  power ratings; in some submarines, these were later upgraded to  systems by removing a midship torpedo tube. Their maximum design depth was  although in service some reached depths of below . Some submarines contained Fessenden oscillator systems.

Crew
Her complement was three officers and 28 men.

Service history
E22 was involved in experiments in the North Sea to intercept Zeppelins on 24 April 1916. E22 carried two Sopwith Schneider seaplane scouts on her casing. The boat would then submerge in calm waters and the planes would float on the surface. They would then take off and then return to the East coast of England at Felixstowe. The trials were not repeated.

There were two survivors, ERA F.S. Buckingham and Signalman William Harrod, taken prisoner by the U-Boat.

References

Bibliography

External links
 HMS E22 - Online Memorial
 'Submarine losses 1904 to present day' - Royal Navy Submarine Museum 

 

British E-class submarines of the Royal Navy
Ships built in Barrow-in-Furness
1915 ships
World War I submarines of the United Kingdom
Ships sunk by German submarines in World War I
World War I shipwrecks in the North Sea
Royal Navy ship names
Maritime incidents in 1916